Gavião may refer to:

People
 Gavião (Gê), an indigenous Gê-speaking people of Pará and Maranhão, Brazil
Pará Gavião language, a Gê language spoken by the Gavião of Pará and Maranhão
 Gavião (Rondônia), an indigenous people of Rondônia, Brazil
 Gavião of Jiparaná, a Tupian language spoken by the Gavião of Rondônia, Brazil

Places
 Gavião, Bahia, a municipality in Bahia, Brazil
 Gavião, Portugal, a municipality in Portalegre, Portugal
 Gavião (parish), a civil parish in Gavião, Portugal
 Gavião (Vila Nova de Famalicão), a civil parish in Vila Nova de Famalicão, Portugal

Language and nationality disambiguation pages